Liên Chiểu is an urban district of Da Nang in the South Central Coast region of Vietnam. As of 2003 the district had a population of 71,818. The district covers an area of 76 km². The district capital lies at Hòa Minh ward.

The district is divided into five wards (phường):
 Hòa Hiệp Bắc
 Hòa Hiệp Nam
 Hòa Khánh Bắc
 Hòa Khánh Nam
 Hòa Minh

References

Districts of Da Nang